Gerald Lear Wood (born 7 March 1926) is a former Barbadian cricketer who played first-class cricket for Barbados from 1949 to 1959.

Gerald Wood attended Harrison College in Bridgetown. A wicket-keeper and useful batsman, he made his first-class debut in 1949 and was Barbados's regular wicket-keeper for three years. He made a final first-class appearance in 1959, against British Guiana, when he made 53, his highest score.

Wood's father, Lear Wood, a prominent figure in Barbados cricket for many years, played one first-class match for Barbados in 1925.

References

External links
 
 

1926 births
Living people
Barbados cricketers
Barbadian cricketers
People educated at Harrison College (Barbados)